Rondo amoroso, Op. 14, No. 7, is a piano piece written by the Norwegian composer Harald Sæverud.

Compositions for solo piano